Maleeka Ali Bokhari is a Pakistani politician who had been a member of the National Assembly of Pakistan from August 2018 to January 2023 and served as the Parliamentary Secretary for Law and Justice from September 2018 till April 2022.

Political career

She was elected to the National Assembly of Pakistan as a candidate of Pakistan Tehreek-e-Insaf (PTI) on a reserved seat for women from Punjab in 2018 Pakistani general election.

On 7 September 2018, Prime Minister Imran Khan appointed her as Parliamentary Secretary for Law and Justice.

References

Living people
Women members of the National Assembly of Pakistan
Pakistani MNAs 2018–2023
Year of birth missing (living people)
Pakistan Tehreek-e-Insaf MNAs
Pakistani emigrants to the United Kingdom
Naturalised citizens of the United Kingdom
21st-century Pakistani women politicians